Bakri Chepyal, is a gram panchayat (village) under Siddipet mandal, Siddipet district, Telangana, India. As of the 2001 census, the population was around 2000.

Notable people

Nellutla Vijay 
Villages in Medak district